Donald Stratton (July 14, 1922 – February 15, 2020) was an American veteran and memoirist of World War II who served in the United States Navy's Pacific Fleet. He was in the port gun director of the ship  during the attack on Pearl Harbor, when an armor-piercing bomb set off the ship's forward ammunition magazine. Stratton was one of six men in the gun Director who survived the initial attack. Two of the six died in hospital the evening of December 7.

On June 8, 2018 in Colorado Springs, Colorado, a dedication ceremony took place to name the bridge for the newly constructed interchange at interstate 25 and Fillmore Street in honor of Donald G. Stratton.

https://www.elpasoco.com/donald-stratton-bridge-dedication/

Works

References

External links

1922 births
2020 deaths
People from Red Cloud, Nebraska
American memoirists
United States Navy personnel of World War II
United States Navy sailors
Attack on Pearl Harbor